Brooklyn Knights were an American soccer club based in New York City. Founded in 1999, the Knights currently field youth teams in the United Soccer Leagues Super-20 League and Super Y-League.  The team also previously field a team in the USL Premier Development League (PDL), the fourth tier of the American Soccer Pyramid, in the Mid Atlantic Division of the Eastern Conference.  The Knights decided to cease fielding a team in the PDL in January 2013.

The club plays its home games at the Metropolitan Oval in Maspeth, Queens, where they have played since 2004. Brooklyn's team colors are white and blue.

History
The  main philosophy of the Brooklyn Knights revolves around that of player development and the belief that it should be fully accomplished by the time an athlete reaches the age of 23. Despite the Knights' strict adherence to the use of players under-23 (the PDL allows up to eight on a roster), the team has qualified for the PDL national playoffs several times during their existence while fielding players as young as 17 to do so.

In 2000, the Knights became a sponsor of youth soccer teams that are overseen by the Metropolitan Oval Foundation, Inc. that include seven teams ranging from Under-11 to Under-18.

The Knights began playing home games at the Metropolitan Oval in 2004 and, after a short hiatus, returned to the stadium in 2010. The complex was constructed in 1925 and continues to be the oldest soccer-only facility in the United States, hosting 15–20 games each week from March to November.

Notable former players
This list of notable former players comprises players who went on to play professional soccer after playing for the team in the Premier Development League, or those who previously played professionally before joining the team.

  Joseph Afful
  Frank Alesci
  Knox Cameron
  Jeff Carroll
  Edson Elcock
  Gary Flood
  Giuseppe Funicello
  Nicolas Garcia
  Bill Gaudette
  Kyle Hoffer
  Guy-Roland Kpene
  Chris Megaloudis
  Gary Sullivan
  Chris Wingert

Year-by-year
(As of July 6, 2012)

Honors
 USL PDL Northeast Division Champions 2008
 USL PDL Eastern Conference Champions 2007

Head coaches
  Joe Balsamo (2007–2010)
  Andreas Lindberg (2011–2012)

Stadia
 Metropolitan Oval; Maspeth, New York (2004–2006, 2010–present)
 Aviator Field; Brooklyn, New York (2007–2009)
 Stadium at Adelphi University; Garden City, New York 1 game (2010)

Average attendance
Attendance stats are calculated by averaging each team's self-reported home attendances from the historical match archive at https://web.archive.org/web/20100105175057/http://www.uslsoccer.com/history/index_E.html.

 2005: 120
 2006: 105
 2007: 251
 2008: 212
 2009: 405
 2010: 109
 2011: 40
 2012: 42

References

External links
Official Site
Official PDL site
BigAppleSoccer.com Team Page

Association football clubs established in 1999
Defunct Premier Development League teams
Men's soccer clubs in New York (state)
1999 establishments in New York City
Association football clubs disestablished in 2013
2013 disestablishments in New York (state)
Sports in Brooklyn